Hans Böhm (8 April 1890 – 18 July 1957) was a German politician of the Social Democratic Party (SPD) and former member of the German Bundestag.

Life 
Böhm was a member of the state parliament of North Rhine-Westphalia in the first legislative period from 1947 to 1950. In 1947/48 he was also a member of the zone advisory council. He was a member of the German Bundestag from 1949 until his death. In 1949 he was directly elected in the electoral district Bielefeld - Halle. In 1953 he entered the Bundestag via the state list of the SPD.

Literature

References

1890 births
1957 deaths
Members of the Bundestag for North Rhine-Westphalia
Members of the Bundestag 1953–1957
Members of the Bundestag 1949–1953
Members of the Bundestag for the Social Democratic Party of Germany
Members of the Landtag of North Rhine-Westphalia